Microsoft Office 98 Macintosh Edition is a version of Microsoft Office for the classic Mac OS, unveiled at Macworld Expo/San Francisco on January 6, 1998. It introduced the Internet Explorer 4.0 browser and Outlook Express, an Internet e-mail client and usenet newsgroup reader. Office 98 was re-engineered by Microsoft's Macintosh Business Unit to satisfy customers' desire for more Mac-like software.

There are two editions of Office 98: Gold and Standard.

It included drag-and-drop installation, self-repairing applications and Quick Thesaurus, before such features were available in a version of Office for Windows. It also was the first version to support QuickTime movies. The applications in Microsoft Office 98 were:
Microsoft PowerPoint 98
Microsoft Word 98.
Microsoft Excel 98
Outlook Express 4.0
Internet Explorer 4.0
Another rare edition of Microsoft Office 98 Macintosh Edition was published titled: "Microsoft Office 98 Macintosh Gold Edition." This version included everything the normal version included plus Microsoft FrontPage Version 1.0 for Macintosh, Microsoft Bookshelf 98 reference software, and Microsoft Encarta 98 Macintosh Deluxe Edition.

Service releases

System requirements 
 A Mac OS-compatible computer equipped with a PowerPC processor. 
 System 7.5 operating system or later. 
 At least 16 MB of physical RAM to run one application, 32 MB recommended to run multiple applications. 
 Sufficient hard disk space, depending on installation method: 'Drag and drop' or 'Easy' (90 MB), 'Complete' (min. 43 MB to max. 110 MB) or 'Run from CD or Run from network' (7 MB on the client hard disk).
 One CD-ROM drive. 
 An 8-bit color or 4-bit gray-scale display with at least 640 × 400 resolution.
Source of above.

References

Further reading

 Beta test review.

External links
 
 

Office 98 Macintosh Edition
Macintosh-only software
1998 software